Lindor is a surname which is also used as a masculine given name. People with the name include:

Surname
 Brignol Lindor (1970–2001), Haitian radio journalist and news editor
 Francisco Lindor (born 1993), Puerto Rican professional baseball player
 Katheleen Lindor (born 1989), French artistic gymnast

Given name
 George Lindor Brown (1903–1971), British physiologist and academic

See also
 Lindor (disambiguation)

English masculine given names